Sandra Lee "Sandy" Pack was United States Assistant Secretary of the Army (Financial Management and Comptroller) from 2001 to 2003 and Assistant Secretary of the Treasury for Management & Chief Financial Officer from 2005 to 2006.

Biography

Sandy Pack was educated at the College of Notre Dame of Maryland.  After college, she worked at the accounting firm of Ernst & Young.

In February 1999, Pack became director of treasury / chief financial officer for George W. Bush's 2000 presidential campaign, reporting to campaign manager Joe Allbaugh.  Following George W. Bush's victory in the 2000 U.S. presidential campaign, President Bush nominated Pack to be Assistant Secretary of the Army (Financial Management and Comptroller) and, after Senate confirmation, Pack held this office from November 2001 to December 2003.

In December 2003, Pack resigned from her office in the United States Department of the Army to become CFO of George W. Bush's 2004 presidential campaign, reporting to campaign manager Ken Mehlman.  After Bush's victory in the 2004 U.S. presidential election, Bush nominated Pack to be Assistant Secretary of the Treasury for Management & Chief Financial Officer.  Pack subsequently held this office from August 2005 to December 2006.

From December 2006 to December 2008, Pack was the CFO of the Rudy Giuliani U.S. presidential campaign.  From April 2008 to September 2009, she was the John McCain presidential campaign's senior advisor to treasury and accounting.

Since September 2009, Pack has been the chief audit executive of the United States Army Corps of Engineers.

References
"The Bush Appointees", from restoringsanity.com
2001 Hearings on Pack's Nomination as Assistant Secretary of the Army

Year of birth missing (living people)
Living people
United States Army women civilians
American accountants
Women accountants
Notre Dame of Maryland University alumni
George W. Bush administration personnel
Women chief financial officers
American chief financial officers
21st-century American women